Maria Karoline Herder (born 28 January 1750 in Reichenweier, Alsace (then part of Germany), died 15 September 1809 in Weimar) was a German editor who collected and published the works of her famous husband, philosopher Johann Gottfried Herder.

Biography 
She was born Maria Karoline Flachsland, the daughter of Johann Friedrich Flachsland (1715–1755) and his wife Rosina Catharina Mauritii (1717–1765). Orphaned at a young age, she went to live at the home of her sister Friederike Katharina (1744–1801) in Darmstadt. There, she became a member of the "Darmstadt Circle," which became one of the most important developers of a concept they called "sensitivity." Johann Wolfgang von Goethe, who soon became her friend, Franz Michael Leuchsenring, Sophie von La Roche, Johann Heinrich Merck and her future husband Johann Gottfried Herder belonged to the group.

Karoline (sometimes spelled Caroline or Carolina) was considered very open-minded, highly educated, and proficient in several languages. Within the Circle, she was called "Psyche." Later, Goethe called her his "sister."

On 2 May 1773, Karoline married Johann Gottfried Herder (1744–1803) in Darmstadt and took his surname. After the wedding, they moved to Bückeburg where he was named court preacher. In their secluded residence, the couple lived their "happiest" and spiritually fruitful time. There, the young family grew significantly with Gottfried (1774-1806) and August (1776-1838). After moving to Weimar, more children followed, Karl Emil (1779-1857), Luise (1781-1860), and Emil Ernst Gottfried (1783-1855).

Works 
During her marriage, Karoline always took part in her husband's official and literary work and was also an unnamed helper in the creation of many of his works. "No Johann Gottfried Herder without Karoline," poet Johann Gleim boasted of her.  

Her identification with her husband's life and work was consistent throughout her life. She worked tirelessly on his reputation not only during his lifetime but also after his death. As secretary and editor of his writings and the author of numerous letters, as well as a biographer and editor of Herder-Werke, Karoline Herder remained one of the female figures in the Weimar circle of Neoclassicists.

Last years 

A year before Johann Gottfried Herder's death in 1802, he was ennobled by the Elector-Prince of Bavaria, and this act permitted him to add the prefix "von" to his last name. At the same time Karoline added it to hers.

Maria Karoline von Herder died in Weimar on 15 September 1809 at 59 years of age and was buried there in the old Jakobsfriedhof (Jacob's cemetery).

Works 

 Herder, C. Memories from the life of Joh. Gottfried von Herder. Collected and described by Maria Carolina von Herder. 2 vols., Tübingen, 1820

References

External links 

 Works by and about Maria Karoline Flachsland  in the German Digital Library: https://www.deutsche-digitale-bibliothek.de/person/gnd/118549561
Dobbek, Wilhelm, and Maria K. Herder. Karoline Herder. 1967. Print.

1750 births
1809 deaths
Johann Gottfried Herder
People from Weimar
German women editors
German editors